Leslie J. Schumacher (born October 4, 1955) is an American politician in the state of Minnesota. She served in the Minnesota House of Representatives.

References

Women state legislators in Minnesota
Democratic Party members of the Minnesota House of Representatives
1955 births
Living people
People from New Hope, Minnesota
People from Princeton, Minnesota
St. Cloud State University alumni
21st-century American women